Propeamussiidae, sometimes referred to as glass scallops mud scallops or mud pectens, are a taxonomic family of saltwater clams, marine bivalve molluscs in the order Pectinida. As members of the superfamily Pectinoidea, they are closely related to scallops.  Extant species are small in size, poorly known, and inhabit deep waters.  None of the species within this family has a common name.

Valves of these animals are fragile, either equivalved or nearly so, small to medium-sized, and are described as subcircular to obscurely ovate in shape.  Like other scallops, the valves have pronounced "ears" on the anterior and posterior sides of the hinge joint.  Valves are also very nearly equilateral.  All species have a byssal notch which will vary with depth of species.

Fossil species of these epifaunal carnivores lived from the Triassic period to the Quaternary period (242.0 to 0.0 Ma). The majority of fossils of this family are distributed throughout Europe and North America.

Genera
Genera within the family Propeamussidae include:

References

 
Bivalve families
Extant Triassic first appearances